The 2013–14 FA Cup (also known as The FA Cup with Budweiser for sponsorship reasons) was the 133rd season of the FA Cup, the main domestic cup competition in English football, and the oldest football knock-out competition in the world. It was sponsored by Budweiser for a third consecutive season. 737 clubs from England and Wales entered the competition, which began with the Extra Preliminary Round on 16 August. For the first time in the history of the FA Cup, a team from Guernsey entered the competition, Guernsey F.C., who made it to the second round qualifying.

The defending champions were Championship side Wigan Athletic, who beat Manchester City 1–0 with an injury time winner by Ben Watson in the 2013 Final. Wigan were the first team to win the FA Cup and to be relegated in the same season. It was also the first time that they had won the FA Cup in their history. They entered the competition in the third round proper alongside all the Premier League and Championship teams, advancing all the way to the semi-finals.

On 17 May 2014, Arsenal won the final at Wembley Stadium, defeating Hull City 3–2 after an extra time winner from Aaron Ramsey. This was the 11th win in the FA Cup for the club, a tied record together with Manchester United.

As the winners of the FA Cup, Arsenal were entitled to play in the 2014–15 UEFA Europa League group stage. However, Arsenal had already qualified for the 2014–15 UEFA Champions League after finishing fourth in the 2013–14 Premier League so Hull City took the Europa League place as the FA Cup runners-up. Since Hull City did not win the Cup, they did not qualify for the group stage (as the Cup winners would do). Instead they qualified for the third qualifying round and the other English teams already qualified for Europa League, Everton and Tottenham Hotspur, moved up one round to the Europa League group stage and play-off round respectively.

Teams

Prize fund

Qualifying rounds

All of the teams entering the competition that are not members of either the Premier League or the Football League had to compete in the qualifying rounds to win a place in the competition proper. The qualifying rounds decide which 32 non-league teams play in the first round proper.

First round proper
The first round draw took place on Sunday 27 October at 1.35pm. A total of 80 teams will compete, 32 of which having progressed from the Fourth Qualifying Round and 48 clubs from the Football League. The 48 Football League clubs that will enter the first round proper comprise Football League One and Football League Two. The lowest ranked sides in this round were Daventry Town and Shortwood United; they are the only level 8 teams left in the competition.

Second round Proper
The second round draw took place on Sunday 10 November at 4.10pm. A total of 40 teams will compete, all of which having progressed from the first round proper. The lowest ranked side to qualify for this round is Stourbridge. They are the only level 7 team left in the competition.

Notes

Third round Proper
The third round draw took place on Sunday, 8 December at 16:10. A total of 64 teams competed, 20 of which had progressed from the second round proper along with 44 clubs from the Premier League and Football League Championship. The lowest ranked sides that qualified for this round were Kidderminster Harriers, Macclesfield Town and Grimsby Town; they were the only level 5 teams left in the competition.

Fourth round Proper
The fourth round draw took place on Sunday 5 January 2014, live on ITV at 14:00. Kidderminster Harriers were the lowest ranked team to qualify for this round. They were the only non-league / level 5 team left in the competition.

Fifth round Proper
The fifth round draw took place at Wembley Stadium on Sunday 26 January 2014. A total of 16 teams competed, all of which has progressed from the fourth round proper. The lowest ranked side qualified for this round are Sheffield United. They are the only level 3 team in the fifth round.

Sixth round Proper
The draw for the sixth round took place on Sunday 16 February 2014. The lowest ranked side qualified for this round is Sheffield United. They are the only level 3 team in the sixth round.

Semi-finals
 
The draw for the semi-finals took place at Wembley Stadium, London on Sunday 9 March 2014. A total of four teams compete, all of which have progressed from the sixth round proper. The lowest ranked team qualified for this round is Sheffield United. They are the only level 3 team in the semi-finals. The matches were delayed by 7 minutes to mark the 25th anniversary of the Hillsborough Disaster, which took place on 15 April 1989 in an FA Cup semi-final match between Nottingham Forest and Liverpool, claiming 97 lives.

Final

Top scorers

Broadcasting rights
The domestic broadcasting rights for the competition were held by the free-to-air channel ITV and the new subscription channel BT Sport. ITV has held the rights since 2008–09, while BT Sport bought ESPN's remaining FA Cup rights in February 2013. The FA Cup Final must be broadcast live on UK terrestrial television under the Ofcom code of protected sporting events.

These matches were broadcast live on UK television:

References

 
FA Cup seasons
Fa Cup
FA Cup